The 1959 European Judo Championships were the 9th edition of the European Judo Championships, and were held in Vienna, Austria from 9 May 1959.

Medal winners

References 

European Judo Championships
European Judo Championships
European Judo Championships
Sport in Vienna
International sports competitions hosted by Austria
E